Xavier Forneret (16 September 1809 in Beaune, Côte-d'Or – 7 August 1884) was a French writer; poet, playwright and journalist.

Life 
Born in 1809 bourgeois family by the name Antoine Charles Ferdinand, he was one of the few members of the Romantic movement who never experienced poverty and could afford to publish his books himself. In his hometown, he became an advocate of the new art. Between 1837 and 1840 he lived in Paris. Spiritually, he was a member of the Bouzingo, a group of poets which advocated a radical bohemian romanticism in life and art; contemporaries and kindred spirits included Gérard de Nerval and Théophile Gautier, yet the Cénacle in the Rue du Doyenné never accepted him as a member, since the radical romantics saw him as an eccentric bourgeois with little talent. He returned to Beaune after the three years, living his life of a rich eccentric man (he lived in an old gothic tower which had all walls painted black and silver, played violin by open window all night, and slept in a coffin ). In 1848, he unsuccessfully tried to become a republican politician. He died aged 74, forgotten by both critics and readers.

Works 
In 1835 he wrote two plays which were staged in Dijon. He paid for the staging; both were total commercial failures. During his years in Paris, he published books (with the  text usually printed on one side of the paper only, in an enormously large font) which included poems, aphorisms, paradoxes, short prosaic pieces and maxims. He also published several short stories, usually parodies of the then fashionable frenetic (horror) style (in one of them, an unhappy man commits suicide by swallowing the glass eye of his mistress). All these books were self-published and ignored by readers.

Interest in his works started to appear after 1918. His reputation was partly rehabilitated by André Breton, who included some of Forneret's poems and aphorisms in his Anthology of Black Humor.

The Grand Prix de l'Humour Noir Xavier Forneret is named in his memory. Recent winners include Serge Joncour,  and Tom Sharpe.

A collection of Forneret's work was published in 2013 under the title Écrits complets.

Selected bibliography
 Contes et récits
 Deux destinées, 1834
 L'homme noir (The Black Man), 1835, a play
 Vingt-trois. Trente-cinq (Twenty three. Thirty five), 1835, a play
 Rien... quelque chose, 1836
 Sans titre (Untitled), 1838
 Vapeurs, ni vers ni prose et sans titre, par un homme noir, blanc de visage (Vapours, neither poetry nor prose, written by a black man with a white face), 1838
 Encore un an de "sans titre", 1840
 Pièce de pièces, temps perdu, 1840
 Voyage d'agrément de Beaune à Autun, 1850
 Lettre à Victor Hugo, 1851
 Lignes rimées, 1853
 Mère et fille, 1854
 L'infanticide, 1856
 Ombre de poésie, 1860
 Quelques mots sur la peine de mort, 1861
 Broussailles de pensées, 1870

In popular culture 
In the 1992 British horror-romance film, Tale of a Vampire, a centuries-old vampire and scholar (Julian Sands) approaches an occult-specialist librarian (Suzanna Hamilton) whom he sees reading an antique volume of Forneret's works. He tells her that his favorite poem by Forneret is "Le pauvre honteux" ("A Shameful Pauper")—"about a starving man who eats his own hand".

References and external links

External links

 The poem "Le pauvre honteux"
 Poems and a portrait
 Poems
 Le Diamant de l'herbe, a story from 1859
 A study about Xavier Forneret by Fernand Chaffiol-Debillemont from 1952

1809 births
1884 deaths
People from Beaune
French male writers
19th-century French male writers
19th-century French poets